Golan v. Holder, 565 U.S. 302 (2012), was a Supreme Court case that dealt with copyright and the public domain. It held that the "limited time" language of the United States Constitution's Copyright Clause does not preclude the extension of copyright protections to works previously in the public domain.

In particular, the case challenged the constitutionality of the application of Section 514 of the Uruguay Round Agreements Act of 1994, which implemented the provisions of trade agreements seeking to equalize copyright protection on an international basis. In the United States, the Act newly granted copyright status to foreign works previously in the public domain.

The two main arguments against the application of the Act in the case were that restoring copyright violates the "limited time" language of the United States Constitution's Copyright Clause, and that restoring to copyright works that had passed into the public domain interferes with the peoples' First Amendment right to use, copy and otherwise exploit the works and to freely express themselves through these works, thus also violating the Constitution's Copyright Clause.

The US Supreme Court held on January 18, 2012 that Section 514 of the Uruguay Round Agreements Act does not exceed Congress's authority under the Copyright Clause, and the court affirmed the judgment of the lower court by 6–2, with the opinion written by Justice Ginsburg. The practical effect of the decision is to confirm that works that were previously free to use, such as Prokofiev's Peter and the Wolf, are no longer in the public domain and are subject to use only with the permission of the copyright holder, such as through paid licensing, until their copyright term expires again.

History
After the Supreme Court of the United States upheld the 1998 Copyright Term Extension Act in Eldred v. Ashcroft (2003), the United States District Court for the District of Colorado dismissed the plaintiffs' challenge to that act in 2004 (Golan v. Ashcroft). The remaining constitutional challenge to the 1994 Uruguay Round Agreements Act was dismissed the following year (Golan v. Gonzales).

The case affected the copyright status of potentially millions of works, including:
Metropolis (1927)
The Third Man (1949)
The works of Igor Stravinsky
Several works of H. G. Wells, including the film Things to Come (1936)

The case was heard by District Chief Judge Lewis Babcock and was decided by the United States District Court for the District of Colorado in 2005. It was appealed at the Tenth Circuit.

On September 4, 2007, Judge Robert H. Henry of the United States Court of Appeals for the Tenth Circuit affirmed the district court's dismissal of the CTEA claim, as foreclosed by Eldred, and the district court's holding that § 514 of the URAA does not exceed the limitations inherent in the Copyright Clause.

However the Appeals Court did find "Based on the Eldred Court’s analysis, we examine the bedrock principle of copyright law that works in the public domain remain there and conclude that § 514 alters the traditional contours of copyright protection by deviating from this principle" and concluded "since § 514 has altered the traditional contours of copyright protection in a manner that implicates plaintiffs' right to free expression, it must be subject to First Amendment review." It remanded the case to the district court.

U.S. Supreme Court
A related issue was then brought before the court as Golan v. Holder after conductors Lawrence Golan and Richard Kapp filed suit. In a holding published on April 3, 2009, Judge Babcock reversed his earlier finding that the First Amendment was not applicable to resurrecting foreign copyright claims. Judge Babcock found that aspects of the 1994 Uruguay Round Agreements Act, which brought some works whose copyright had lapsed back under copyright, violated First Amendment rights of so-called reliance parties, i.e., parties who had been using a work formerly in the public domain before the URAA became effective, relying on the work being in the public domain, and who would now no longer be able to do so. He wrote, In the United States, that body of law includes the bedrock principle that works in the public domain remain in the public domain. Removing works from the public domain violated Plaintiffs’ vested First Amendment interests. [...] Accordingly—to the extent Section 514 suppresses the right of reliance parties to use works they exploited while the works were in the public domain—Section 514 is substantially broader than necessary to achieve the Government’s interest. He also indicated a possible solution by suggesting that the protection of reliance parties be made not limited in time. However, further appeals by copyright owners were expected.

On June 21, 2010, the Tenth Circuit reversed the judgment of the district court and remanded with instructions to grant summary judgment in favor of the government, thus upholding the constitutionality of the URAA copyright restoration. Golan filed for certiorari in the Supreme Court of the United States asking for the Court to hear the case.
On March 7, 2011, the Court granted the writ of certiorari. Oral argument was held October 5, 2011.

On June 12, 2011, the International Music Score Library Project (IMSLP, Petrucci Music Library) announced they would submit an amicus curiae brief in the case; a group of Harvard Law School students, supervised by Professor Charles Nesson,  represented IMSLP. Other parties that filed amicus curiae briefs include:

 The Electronic Frontier Foundation on behalf of the Internet Archive and the University of Michigan Dean of Libraries. Joining were the Wikimedia Foundation, the American Library Association, the Association of College and Research Libraries, and the Association of Research Libraries.
 H. Tomas Gomez-Arostegui (Lewis & Clark Law School) and Tyler T. Ochoa (Santa Clara University School of Law)
 The Eagle Forum Education & Legal Defense Fund
 Professor Daniel J. Gervais (Professor at Vanderbilt University Law School)
 Public Knowledge
 The Cato Institute
 Peter Decherney
 Heartland Angels
 Creative Commons
 Public Domain Interests
 The Justice and Freedom Fund
 Professors and Fellows from the Information Society Project at Yale Law School
 The American Civil Liberties Union
 The Conductors Guild
 The Music Library Association
 The American Library Association (which also joined the Internet Archive's brief)
 The College Art Association
 Google
 The International Publishers Association
 The International Coalition for Copyright Protection
 The American Society of Composers, Authors and Publishers (ASCAP)
 The Intellectual Property Owners Association (IPO)
 The Motion Picture Association of America (MPAA)
 The American Bar Association
 The Franklin Pierce Center for Intellectual Property
 The American Intellectual Property Law Association.

Decision
On January 18, 2012, the Supreme Court affirmed the Tenth Circuit's decision 6–2. The majority opinion was written by Justice Ginsburg and joined by Roberts, Scalia, Kennedy, Thomas, and Sotomayor. The dissent was written by Justice Breyer and joined by Justice Alito. Justice Kagan recused.

The majority held that "The Berne Convention for the Protection of Literary and Artistic Works (Berne), which took effect in 1886, is the principal accord governing international copyright relations." The court also held that changing the term of copyright for works in such a way that it diminishes or eliminates rights in the work (in this case the right of the public to the works) does not violate the takings clause of the Fifth Amendment.

Dissenting opinion
Breyer, dissenting, wrote:

See also
List of United States Supreme Court cases, volume 565
List of copyright case law

Notes

References

Further reading

External links
 
 
 Complaint in Golan v. Ashcroft at cyber.law.harvard.edu

United States Constitution Article One case law
Copyright Clause case law
2012 in United States case law
United States Supreme Court cases
United States Supreme Court cases of the Roberts Court
Public domain in the United States